The 2009 Toledo Rockets football team represented The University of Toledo during the 2009 NCAA Division I FBS football season and as a member of the Mid-American Conference (MAC) East Division.  The team was coached by Tim Beckman and played their homes game in the Glass Bowl. The finished with a record of 5–7 (3–5 MAC).

Before the season

Recruiting

Schedule

Roster

Coaching staff

Game summaries

Purdue

Scoring Summary

1st Quarter
 13:48 PUR Bolden 78-yard run (Wiggs kick) 7-0 PUR
 04:14 PUR Taylor 43-yard run (Wiggs kick) 14-0 PUR

2nd Quarter
 13:53 PUR Smith 11-yard pass from Elliott (Wiggs kick) 21-0 PUR
 11:17 TOLEDO Youngs 34-yard pass from Opelt (Steigerwald kick) 21-7 PUR
 05:40 TOLEDO Williams 9-yard pass from Opelt (Steigerwald kick) 21-14 PUR
 01:25 PUR Carlos 24-yard pass from Elliott (Wiggs kick) 28-14 PUR
 00:00 PUR Wiggs 59-yard field goal 31-14 PUR

3rd Quarter
 12:05 PUR Taylor 1-yard run (Wiggs kick) 38-14 PUR
 08:09 PUR Edison 15-yard pass from Elliott (Wiggs kick) 45-14 PUR
 04:41 TOLEDO Collins 5-yard run (Steigerwald kick) 45-21 PUR

4th Quarter
 11:37 TOLEDO Steigerwald 48-yard field goal 45-24 PUR
 06:36 TOLEDO Williams 42-yard pass from Opelt (Steigerwald kick) 45-31 PUR
 02:27 PUR Bolden 14-yard run (Wiggs kick) 52-31 PUR

Colorado

Scoring Summary

1st Quarter
 07:18 TOLEDO Noble 8-yard pass from Opelt (Claus pass failed) 6-0 TOLEDO
 03:00 TOLEDO Youngs 70-yard pass from Opelt (Steigerwald kick) 13-0 TOLEDO

2nd Quarter
 13:31 CU Goodman 32-yard field goal 13-3 TOLEDO
 09:59 TOLEDO Steigerwald 50-yard field goal 16-3 TOLEDO
 00:36 TOLEDO Opelt 27-yard run (Steigerwald kick) 23-3 TOLEDO

3rd Quarter
 12:36 TOLEDO Stafford 26-yard pass from Opelt (Steigerwald kick) 30-3 TOLEDO
 07:26 CU McKnight 4-yard pass from Hawkins (Goodman kick) 30-10 TOLEDO
 04:51 TOLEDO Burzine 23-yard pass from Opelt (Steigerwald kick) 30-10 TOLEDO
 01:43 CU Espinoza 5-yard pass from Hawkins (Goodman kick) 37-17 TOLEDO
 01:23 CU Geer 4-yard pass from Hawkins (Goodman kick) 37-24 TOLEDO

4th Quarter
 14:10 TOLEDO Opelt 61-yard run (Steigerwald kick) 44-24 TOLEDO
 08:41 TOLEDO Collins 23-yard run (Steigerwald kick) 51-24 TOLEDO
 04:01 TOLEDO Steigerwald 43-yard field goal 54-24 TOLEDO
 02:56 CU Devenny 18-yard pass from Hawkins (Goodman kick) 54-31 TOLEDO
 01:53 CU Hawkins 12-yard run (Goodman kick) 54-38 TOLEDO

Ohio State

Scoring Summary

1st Quarter
 13:13 OSU Sanzenbacher 76-yard pass from Pryor (Pettrey kick) 7-0 OSU
 05:51 OSU Sanzenbacher 18-yard pass from Pryor (Pettrey kick) 14-0 OSU

2nd Quarter
 12:31 OSU Herron 4-yard run (Pettrey kick) 21-0 OSU
 00:00 OSU Pettrey 47-yard field goal 24-0 OSU

3rd Quarter
 07:59 OSU Pryor 1-yard run (Pettrey kick) 31-0 OSU

4th Quarter
 07:10 OSU Posey 4-yard pass from Pryor (Pettrey kick) 38-0 OSU

Florida International

Ball State

Western Michigan

Scoring Summary

1st Quarter
 13:51 WMU White 54-yard pass from Hiller (Potter kick) 7-0 WMU
 10:59 WMU White 19-yard pass from Hiller (Potter kick) 14-0 WMU
 09:54 WMU Nunez 12-yard pass from West (Potter kick failed) 20-0 WMU
 08:20 TOLEDO Steigerwald 21-yard field goal 20-3 WMU
 02:33 TOLEDO Steigerwald 40-yard field goal 20-6 WMU

2nd Quarter
 14:49 WMU West 15-yard run (Potter kick) 27-6 WMU
 12:03 WMU Nunez 2-yard pass from Hiller (Potter kick) 34-6 WMU
 04:59 WMU West 19-yard run (Potter kick) 41-6 WMU
 00:08 TOLEDO Page 6-yard pass from Dantin (Claus pass failed) 41-12 WMU

3rd Quarter
 14:36 WMU West 70-yard run (Potter kick) 48-12 WMU
 06:14 WMU Potter 37-yard field goal 51-12 WMU
 00:16 TOLEDO Williams 18-yard pass from Dantin (Steigerwald kick) 51-19 WMU

4th Quarter
 06:12 TOLEDO Shumaker 8-yard pass from Dantin (Steigerwald kick) 51-26 WMU
 04:58 WMU Thompson 29-yard run (Potter kick) 58-26 WMU

Northern Illinois

Temple

Scoring Summary

1st Quarter
 11:43 TEMPLE Campbell 11-yard pass from Charlton (McManus kick blocked) 6-0 TEMPLE
 6:49 TEMPLE Pierce 1-yard run (McManus kick) 13-0 TEMPLE
 6:36 TOLEDO Williams 85 yards kickoff return (Steigerwald kick) 13-7 TEMPLE

2nd Quarter
 12:58 TEMPLE Pierce 39-yard run (McManus kick) 20-7 TEMPLE
 9:58 TEMPLE McManus 30-yard field goal 23-7 TEMPLE
 6:16 TOLEDO Steigerwald 48-yard field goal 23-10 TEMPLE
 0:38 TOLEDO Collins 6-yard run (Steigerwald kick) 23-17 TEMPLE

3rd Quarter
 9:26 TEMPLE Pierce 2-yard run (McManus kick) 30-17 TEMPLE
 4:16 TEMPLE McManus 29-yard field goal 33-17 TEMPLE

4th Quarter
 11:00 TEMPLE Harper 36-yard pass from Charlton 40-17 TEMPLE
 3:02 TOLEDO Youngs 27-yard pass from Pettee (Steigerwald kick) 40-24 TEMPLE

Miami (OH)

Central Michigan

Eastern Michigan

Bowling Green

References

Toledo
Toledo Rockets football seasons
Toledo Rockets football